Mohamed Hussein (born 10 September 1991) is an Egyptian swimmer. At the 2016 Summer Olympics he competed in the Men's 200 m individual medley.

References

1991 births
Living people
Olympic swimmers of Egypt
Swimmers at the 2016 Summer Olympics
African Games bronze medalists for Egypt
African Games medalists in swimming
Competitors at the 2011 All-Africa Games
Male medley swimmers
Male backstroke swimmers
Egyptian male swimmers